Rovinj (Istriot:  or ;) is a city in Croatia situated on the north Adriatic Sea with a population of 14,294 (2011). Located on the western coast of the Istrian peninsula, it is a popular tourist resort and an active fishing port. Istriot, a Romance language once widely spoken in this part of Istria, is still spoken by some of the residents. The town is officially bilingual, Croatian and Italian, hence both town names are official and equal.

History

Rovinj/Rovigno was already a settlement of Venetian or Illyrian tribes before being captured by the Romans, who called it Arupinium or Mons Rubineus, and later Ruginium and Ruvinium. Built on an island close to the coast, it became connected to the mainland much later, in 1763, by filling in the channel.

Rovinj/Rovigno was eventually incorporated into the Byzantine Empire, later becoming part of the Exarchate of Ravenna in the 6th century, before being taken over by the Frankish Empire in 788. For the following several centuries it was ruled by a succession of feudal lords, and in 1209 it was acquired by the Patriarchate of Aquileia under Wolfger von Erla.

From 1283 to 1797 Rovinj was one of the most important towns in Istria governed by the Republic of Venice. During this period three town gates were constructed and Rovinj/Rovigno was fortified by two rows of defensive walls, remains of which can still be seen today. Nearby the Rovinj/Rovigno pier one can find one of the old town gates, the Balbi's Arch, dating from 1680, and a late-Renaissance clock tower. The first city statute was proclaimed in 1531.

Following the fall of Venice in 1797 and the ensuing Napoleonic interlude, Rovinj/Rovigno became part of the Austrian Empire, which lasted until World War I. According to the last Austrian census in 1911, 97.8% of the population was Italian-speaking. It then belonged to Kingdom of Italy from 1918 to 1947, when it was ceded to SFR Yugoslavia, as part of SR Croatia. The original town name Rovigno was then changed into Rovinj. During the post-war period, many Italian inhabitants left Rovinj, which led to significant changes to the city's demographic structure.

Following Croatia's independence in 1991, the town became one of the most important centers of Istria County, an administrative unit encompassing most of Istria. Rovinj/Rovigno is today the third most populous town in the county, behind Pula and Poreč.

Climate
Rovinj/Rovigno is one of nine settlements officially designated as towns in Istria County in western Croatia.

From May to September Rovinj receives more than 10 sunshine hours a day. The rainfall averages  a year and average air humidity is 72 percent.

Originally the peninsula on which the city lies was an island, separated from the mainland by a channel. The latter was filled in 1763. Rovinj/Rovigno Archipelago includes 22 islets.

Population

In the 2011 census, there were 14,294 people living in Rovinj municipality. Croats form the majority at 63.3%, while ethnic minorities include Italians (11.3%), those identifying with regional affiliation (10.5%), Serbs (4.2%), Albanians (2.7%) and Bosniaks (2.1%).

City government
The City Assembly is composed of 19 representatives, coming from the following political parties:

 Istrian Democratic Assembly (IDS) 13
 Independent 3
 Social Democratic Party of Croatia (SDP) 2
 Croatian Democratic Union (HDZ) 1

Economy

The main economic activity in Rovinj is tourism and during peak season (May–September), its bars, restaurants and art galleries work long hours, while operating limited hours off-season.

The busiest area is the very centre of Rovinj, extending from the main bus station towards the old part of town, where most bars and clubs are located.

The town's main central thoroughfare is the fully pedestrian Carrera Street, with many independent shops and art galleries. A farmer's market is located at the edge of the historic part of town, near Valdibora Square.

According to data compiled by Istria Tourist Board, Rovinj is the second biggest tourist destination in the county, in terms of overnight stays. The two closest airports are in Pula/Pola (Croatia) and Trieste (Italy). During the summer season, low-cost airlines such as Ryanair operate direct flights from western Europe to both airports. Easyjet operates flights between cities in the United Kingdom and Pula in the summer months.

There are numerous hotels in the town itself, and beds are abundant though usually overbooked in the summer months. Accommodation ranges from private rooms or apartments to bungalows, camping sites and 2 to 5 star hotels. The city also has three luxury, 5-star hotels: Hotel Monte Mulini, Hotel Lone and Grand Park Hotel Rovinj, all owned by hotel group Maistra. Apart from hotels on the mainland, there are also a handful of hotels on small islands surrounding Rovinj which are linked to the mainland by boats which go from the city centre to the hotel on the islands.

Sights and landmarks

 St. Euphemia's Basilica
 Monkodonja
 Zlatni Rt Forest Park
 The Rovinj islands and mainland. These natural sights have been described as "outstanding scenic wonders," because of the pristine beauty of the indented coastline and its forests, consisting of holm oak and Alpine pine trees. This area "of outstanding natural beauty" extends from St. Ivan promontory to Barbariga, including all the Rovinj islands and the mainland 500 metres from the shore line. The Rovinj archipelago consists of 19 islands.
 Limska Draga Fjord
 The Palud marsh and the Due Sorelle Islands – The Due Sorelle (Two Sisters) islands are a nesting site for seagulls. Because of its thick holm oak forest, the Gustinja promontory is regarded as "a forest vegetation reserve."
 Rovinj Town Museum

Transportation
The preferred means of transport for getting around Rovinj is by car. Rovinj is well-connected with the rest of Istria and with larger cities in the region such as Trieste, Venice, Rijeka, Ljubljana and Zagreb.

The centre of Rovinj, which includes the old town, is very walkable and transportation by bike or scooter is a preferred means of getting around for many locals.

The closest commercial international airports are Pula/Pola (20 miles), Trieste-Ronchi (70 miles) and Rijeka-Krk (80 miles). The closest major international airports are Venice and Zagreb. Car rental is available at each of the airports. During the Summer season, Venice is connected to Rovinj via a direct ferry line which takes about 2.5 hours one way. 

Rovinj is served by the Kanfanar railway station (10 miles), which connects the region to Rijeka/Fiume. However, travelling by bus is preferred to travelling by train due to the limited connections and schedules. The main bus station is located at the south-east end of Carrera Street.

Between 1876 and 1966, Rovinj was connected to Kanfanar via a branch line of the Istriani Railway, which was closed supposedly due to heavy motorisation investments by Yugoslavia. Most of the tracks and stations, even though they have been sold by JZ, can still be seen.

Also during the summer season, there is a direct high speed ferry link between Venice and Rovinj. High speed weekly lines to the Port of Ravenna and Cesenatico were also available in the summer season until 2012/13, when Emilia-Romagna lines, its operator, closed for insolvency.

Education
Primary schools
 Juraj Dobrila – 8-year Croatian primary school.
 Vladimir Nazor – 8-year Croatian primary school located in the old part of town just above Carrera road.
 Bernardo Benussi – Scuola Elementare Italiana – 8-year Italian primary school.

Secondary schools
 Zvane Črnje – Croatian secondary (13–18) school.
 Strukovna Škola Eugena Kumičića – Croatian secondary (13–18) school for professional development.
 Scuola Media Superiore Italiana Rovigno (SMSIR) – Italian secondary school.

Notable residents
 Giustina Abbà (1903-1974) partisan, anti-fascist and worker.
  (1911-1944) partisan and anti-fascist who gave his name to the Partisan Battalion Pino Budicin

Twin towns
Rovinj is twinned with:
  Adria, Italy (since 1982)
  Camaiore, Italy (since 1990)
  Leonberg, Germany (since 1990)
  Pesaro, Italy

References

Bibliography

Notes

External links

Virtual Rovinj guide
 
RovinjTourist Board
RovinjTourist Guide
inforovinj – RovinjTourist Guide

Cities and towns in Croatia
Populated coastal places in Croatia
Populated places in Istria County
Italian-speaking territorial units in Croatia